Frank Nielsen may refer to:
 Frank Nielsen (Australian footballer)
 Frank Nielsen (Danish footballer)